The Myrtle Irene (USCG id: 643114) is a crewed flat-topped power barge adapted into a littorals at-sea excavator dredge mining vessel designed By Tony Messina out of Northern Wisconsin . It is owned by Arctic Sea Mining, LLC and its registered home port is Nome, Alaska, USA. This excavator dredge mining barge is introduced and featured since the 2018 season 10 in Bering Sea Gold, a Discovery Channel USA reality TV show on sea mining for gold in Alaska. The excavator dredge cost $6,000,000 to build.

Specifications

Vessel 1495
 Launch date: 1981
 Length:  ;  with extension.
 Width: 
 Depth: 
 Net tonnage: 
 Gross tonnage: 

 Mining depth:

See also
 Tuvli 160
 Christine Rose (dredge)
 AU Grabber
 Viking Dredge 1
 Viking Dredge 2
 Bima (dredge)

References

External links
 Boat Database (boatdb.net) Nome, AK port boats

Bering Sea Gold
Dredgers
Ships of the United States